thefucKINGFUCKS is an underground Belgian industrial rock performance art group that began as a musical side-project for controversial visual artist Kendell Geers, Patrick Codenys of Front 242. From 2007 they collaborated with Choreographer / Performer Ilse Ghekiere from Charleroi Danses. but Ghekiere left in 2009 to pursue her solo career.   The group was launched in April 2003 at the Pompidou Centre in Paris with a concert called "Prototype" under the name "Red Sniper".  Since then, the group have performed in music festivals like Elektra Festival Electronic Festival in Montreal Canada, a concert called "10 Guests" curated by Revolting Cocks founding member Luc van Acker,  "Guided by Heroes" curated by Fashion Designer Raf Simons for Z33 in Hasselt and the Techno Music Festival 10DAYSOFF in Gent.  Bootleg recordings of this concert are available for download on pirate torrent sites.

Background

thefucKINGFUCKS are an Open source Artist collective strongly influenced by the ideas and theories of the Acéphale group of Georges Bataille from the 1930s. The collective functions within a more experimental based esoteric research group and an exoteric Performance Art and music group. Secretive research into the history and nature of rituals, rites, initiation, sacred sexuality and Magick is then translated into the public, more popular languages of performance, art, music, dance or installation. Following the Acéphale model, there is a complete rejection of any form of social and political hierarchy and the group opposes any authoritarian form of leadership in terms of both their structure and their production. The operative members change even though the core has remained fixed since its inception in 2003. The group rejects the divisions that exist today between the different art forms and instead insist on working simultaneously in the worlds of dance, music and the visual arts. Frequently the collective presents their Performances or actions alongside their official more famous productions. For instance 
"PostPunkPaganPop" was the title of a solo exhibition by Kendell Geers at the Depuryluxemburg Gallery in Zurich in June 2008. At the opening he presented a performance with the same name as "thefucKINFUCKS"  It was also the title for a performance by thefucKINGFUCKS presented at the Cimatics V.J. Festival in Brussels in 2007  and the S.M.A.K. Museum in Gent

Name 
The group decided on the name thefucKINGFUCKS since the word FUCK remains forbidden on most television channels and especially on MTV, to which the group is generally opposed. They  selected the name "thefucKINGFUCKS" (a line in the David Lynch film Blue Velvet) in order to preclude assimilation into mainstream media.

PostPunkPaganPop

The term PostPunkPaganPop has been used by Geers to describe both his own work and that of thefucKINGFUCKS. Post-punk defines an attitude as a musical genre, whereas pagan defines the groups interest in rites, rituals and the question of faith. The public face of the group maintains the Pop centred style of music that Codenys became famous for in the 1980s.

LostLustLast

On the 26 June 2008 Kendell Geers and Ilse Ghekiere presented their collaborative work in an installation at the Royal Monceau "Demolition Party"  in Paris. The installation called "LostLustLast" was "an orgy of ink that resembled the scene of a crime of passion"  The pair worked in situ for a week, using the body to imprint images upon the walls, floor and bed.

Body Sound Image

The performances are an audio-visual-sensory-experience. In the 1980s Patrick Codenys used the terms Electronic body music to describe the music of Front 242. A generation later Kendell Geers defines his art as a "Panaesthetik", a term that attempts to describe an all-encompassing notion of aesthetics. Together with Ilse Ghekiere, their performances are sensory overload in which the senses of hearing, seeing, smalling, even touching are all pushed to their limits. The razorblade installations of Geers are the backdrop to the grinding electronic body music rhythms and beats of Codenys and the erotic female body in trance of Ghekiere is the key to unlocking the mystery. As a reflection of their interest in the dark arts, the sounds tend to hang in the extreme low sub base area and heard in the pit of your stomach more than the ears.

Multiple Identities

Since 2004 thefucKINFUCKS have performed under the names "Red Sniper, Head Sniper, Firewire, Akephale, Kissing Kousins, USB2, PostPunkPaganPop, S338 and Suite 338. The number 338 is frequently used by the group as a reference to the group Front 242 because United Nations Resolution 338  is the annex to Resolution 242.

Playlist

2011
30th Anniversary PARADE GROUND, Magasin 4, Brussels, Belgium 
"Rhythm and Chaos" Cafe Central, Brussels 
"Body Farm Festival" Belvédère de Namur 

2008
POSTPUNKPAGANPOP, DePuryLxuemburg Gallery, Zurich, Switzerland
LostLustLast, Royal Monceau Hotel, Paris, France
A Spy in the House of Love, OPA, Guadalajara, Mexico
Smoking, MARCO, Vigo, Spain

2007
CIMATIC/07AV/FestivalBrussels International Festival for Live Audiovisual Art&VJing, Beursschouwburg,Brussels, Belgium
50 Jaar Vrienden V/H Smak, Ghent, Belgium
10 DAYS OFF, Vooruit, Ghent, Belgium
Biennale Charleroi danse, BPS22, Charleroi, Belgium

2006
Playlist, Palais de Tokyo, Paris, France

2005
Cultuurcentrum Evergem, Belgium
Les Grands Spectacles - 120 Jahre Kunst und Massenkultur, Museum der Moderne Salzburg, Mönchsberg, Austria
Elektra Festival, Montréal, Canada
Strange, Familiar and Unforgotten, Galerie Erna Hécey, Brussels, Belgium
Dans le Collimateur, Dieppe Scene Nationale, Dieppe, France

2004
Criminal Brides, Buda, Kortijk, Belgium
Videozone, Center for Contemporary Art, Tel Aviv, Israel
Playlist, Palais de Tokyo, Paris, France
Opera Video, Galleria Continua, San Gimignano, Italy
                    
2003
Rhythm and Chaos,Transart 03, Bolzano, Italy
Rhythm and Chaos, Beaulieu Art Gallery, Oudenaarde, Belgium
10 Guests, curated by Luk van Acker, Handelsbeursgebouw,Ghent, Belgium
Guided by Heroes, curated by Raf Simons, Z33, Hasselt, Belgium
Prototype, Centre Pompidou, Paris

External links
 Official Kendell Geers Website
 Official FRONT 242 website
 POSTPUNKPAGANPOP Performance Presented at Depuryluxemburg Gallery, Zurich
 Demolition Party, Royal Monceau Hotel, Paris, 26 June 2008

Notes and references

Electronic body music groups
Belgian industrial music groups
Performance artist collectives